Bjørn Bolstad Skjelbred (born 1970) is a Norwegian composer, arranger, improviser and teacher.

Career

Skjelbred is educated from the Norwegian Academy of Music. His list of works encompasses more than 60 works in a variety of genres: solo- and chamber music, electro-acoustic pieces, works for sinfonietta and orchestra as well as film and theatre scores. He has worked with a number of groups, ensembles and performers including theatre collective De Utvalgte, percussionist Eirik Raude, ensemble Pärlor for svin, Nordic Voices, Ensemble 2000 and flautist Marianne Leth.

Skjelbred’s works have seen performances in the Nordic countries, Germany, France, the US and Canada at festivals such as Ultima Oslo Contemporary Music Festival, Ilios and UKM.

Parallel to his compositional career, Skjelbred teaches composition and improvisation. He has also served as deputy director of Ny Musikk Oslo and a member of the board for the Norwegian Society of Composers.

Selected works

Large ensembles 
 Different Rooms (2017)
 On Shaking Ground commissioned by Manger Musikklag (2015)
 Shadows of an Anthem II - 2014, commissioned and premiered by Oslo Philharmonic Orchestra (2014)
 Wave-Chains [Liquid reconstruction 1] –  Sinfonietta (2005)
 Shadows of an Anthem  Commissioned by the Norwegian Radio Orchestra (2004–2005)
 Inside a moving Spiral, (2002)
 In a different Light, (1997–2001)
 Evolving,  (1998)
 Trippelkonsert, Sinfonietta og Fagott/Cello/Slagverk-solister Dur. 20'30", (1993–1995)
 Oppvåkning, (1993–1994)

Small ensembles 
 as the wind behaves (2015)
 ConVergEnce (2013)
 In ruins (2016)
 Strykekvartett No.1 ”Fallen Angels”  (2005–2006)
 3 Studies for Saxophone Quartet, (2006)
 Cycles (2006)
 2 Pieces for String-Ensemble, (2004/05)
 3 Pieces for 4 Accordions , (2003)
 Cycles, (2001)
 3 Studies for 4 Alt-Saxes, (2001)
 4 Studies for 3 Flutes, (2001)
 3 Grooves, (2001–2003)
 3 Grooves, (2001–2002)

Solo 
 Nothing has Changed Everything is New (2012/2014)
  NYX Dur. 9'30" (2013)
 Recognizing the Undercurrent 1 Dur. 8 (2013)
 IYOU, (2005)
 Waves & Interruptions, (2005)
 Music for restless Minds, (2002–2003)
 22 små Klavérstykker (2001–2002)
 Breathe, (1999)
 Rising, (1998)
 Head or Gut?, (1996)
 Stream, (1995)
 Moves, (1992–1993)

Music for young performers 
 Don Giovanni : Remake (2012)
 Polyfonia (2009)
 Inside a moving Spiral (2002)
 Oppvåkning (1995)
 3 Studies for Saxophone Quartet (2006)
 Cycles (2006)
 2 Pieces for String-Ensemble (2004/05)
 3 Pieces for 4 Accordeons (2003)
 Cycles , (2001)
 3 Studies for 4 Alt-Saxes (2001)
 4 Studies for 3 Flutes, (2001)
 3 Grooves (2001–2003)
 3 Grooves (2001–2002)
 E, (2000)
 Echoes & Turns, 4 (1998)
 Nocturnal Transition (2006)
 Hall of Mirrors (2004)
 Floating Upwards (2002)
 Bølger-Stille (2000)
 22 små Klavérstykker (2001–2002)

Discography
 Erlend Aagard-Nilsen, Perpetuum Trompetuum (2015)
 Roy Henning Snyen, Preludes for Guitar (2015)
 Bjørn Bolstad Skjelbred, Waves & Interruptions (2014)
 The London Schubert Players, A European Odyssey (2012)
 European Odyssey CD Series, Enescus Farewell (2011)
 European Odyssey CD Series, Les Enfants du Paradis (2011)
 Urban Visions, Urban Songs (2005)
 Live Maria Roggen & Lars Andreas Haug,  [TU´BA]  (2005)

References

External links
Bjørn Bolstad Skjelbred page Official web page
Bjørn Bolstad Skjelbred page from Music Information Centre Norway site
Bjørn Bolstad Skjelbred biography from Music Information Centre Norway site
List of works
Member of the Norwegian Society of Composers
List of Works supplied by the National Library of Norway

1970 births
20th-century classical composers
21st-century classical composers
Living people
Norwegian classical composers
Norwegian male classical composers
20th-century Norwegian male musicians
21st-century Norwegian male musicians